is a Japanese voice actress from Kanagawa Prefecture who is affiliated with Arts Vision. She played her first main role in 2018 as Akira Ono in the anime television series Hi Score Girl. She is also known for her roles as Kylie in The Magnificent Kotobuki,  Uruka Takemoto in We Never Learn and Wise in Do You Love Your Mom and Her Two-Hit Multi-Target Attacks?. In 2020, she received the Best Rookie Award at the 14th Seiyu Awards.

Filmography

Anime
2017
Love Live! Sunshine!! as Female student
Classicaloid as Woman, employee
Konohana Kitan

2018
Hi Score Girl as Akira Ono
Gundam Build Divers as Lip
Yuuna and the Haunted Hot Springs
The Girl in Twilight
Bloom Into You as Serizawa

2019
The Magnificent Kotobuki as Kylie
Kaguya-sama: Love Is War as Kei Shirogane
We Never Learn as Uruka Takemoto
Do You Love Your Mom and Her Two-Hit Multi-Target Attacks? as Wise
Hi Score Girl II as Akira Ono

2020
A Certain Scientific Railgun T as Rakko Yumiya
Kaguya-sama: Love Is War? as Kei Shirogane
Monster Girl Doctor as Ily
The Misfit of Demon King Academy as Himka Houra

2021
86 as Kurena Kukumila
Seirei Gensouki: Spirit Chronicles as Christina Beltrum 
That Time I Got Reincarnated as a Slime as Nine-Head

2022
The Strongest Sage With the Weakest Crest as Lurie
Requiem of the Rose King as Lady Anne Neville
The Dawn of the Witch as Holt
Kaguya-sama: Love Is War -Ultra Romantic- as Kei Shirogane
In the Heart of Kunoichi Tsubaki as Asagao
Shine Post as Haru Nabatame
Bocchi the Rock! as Nijika Ijichi

2023
Blue Lock as Sena Naruhaya (ep 15)
Don't Toy with Me, Miss Nagatoro 2nd Attack as Hana Sunomiya
KonoSuba: An Explosion on This Wonderful World! as Dodonko
The Café Terrace and Its Goddesses as Ami Tsuruga
The Vexations of a Shut-In Vampire Princess as Villhaze

TBA
My Friend's Little Sister Has It In for Me! as Iroha Kohinata

Film
2019
KonoSuba: God's Blessing on This Wonderful World! Legend of Crimson as Dodonko

2020
High School Fleet: The Movie as Keiko Nogiwa

Video games
2019
Azur Lane as U-101

2020
Atelier Ryza 2: Lost Legends & the Secret Fairy as Cassandra Cappelli

2021
Arknights as Jackie

2022
Hyperdimension Neptunia: Sisters vs. Sisters as Maho
Dead or Alive Xtreme Venus Vacation as Amy
Blue Archive as Noa Ushio

2023
Master Detective Archives: Rain Code as Shinigami

References

External links
 Official agency profile 
 

Living people
Arts Vision voice actors
Japanese video game actresses
Japanese voice actresses
Voice actresses from Kanagawa Prefecture
21st-century Japanese actresses
1998 births